L. minuta  may refer to:
 Lemna minuta, the least duckweed, an aquatic plant species native to parts of the Americas
 Lyces minuta, a moth species endemic to eastern Ecuador

See also
 Minuta